Hurricane Debby was the strongest tropical cyclone of the 1982 Atlantic hurricane season, with winds peaking at . The fourth named storm, second hurricane, and the only major hurricane of the season, Debby developed near the north coast of Hispaniola from a westward moving tropical wave on September 13, 1982. Forming as a tropical depression, it headed northwestward, and eventually strengthened into Tropical Storm Debby the following day. Thereafter, Debby rapidly intensified into a hurricane early on September 15. The hurricane then curved northeastward and grazed Bermuda as a Category 2 hurricane on September 16.

After reaching peak intensity, Debby slowly weakened, and was between Category 2 and 1 when it passed south of Newfoundland early on September 19. Thereafter, the storm accelerated and was moving at roughly  towards the east. Debby was rapidly approaching the British Isles on September 20, shortly before it transitioned into an extratropical cyclone. Overall, impact was minor in the Lesser Antilles, with only light to moderate rainfall in Dominican Republic, Puerto Rico, and the United States Virgin Islands. On Bermuda, high winds caused some power outages and knocked over trees, though damage on the island was minimal. In addition, Debby dropped rainfall and produced moderately strong winds on Newfoundland.

Meteorological history

A weather system moved off the coast of Africa on September 3. The disturbance was small and became unidentifiable within 24 hours of formation. Satellite imagery indicated that the disturbance may have acquired a circulation on September 7, but the circulation was gone by the next day. The remaining tropical wave moved into the Lesser Antilles on September 11 and a reconnaissance aircraft was deployed. The aircraft found circulation; however, by the next day, only a strong wave was detected. Atmospheric conditions became more favorable for development, yielding lower wind shear near Hispaniola for several days. The system moved into this area as the latest Reconnaissance aircraft was deployed, declaring it a tropical depression on September 13 near the Dominican Republic.

Uncertainty arose as to whether Debby would interact with an approaching trough or enter the influence of a ridge over the southeastern United States. The storm was later picked up by the trough, moving away from land and moved to the north. Debby strengthened further, becoming a minimal hurricane late on September 14.

Debby began to slow down to  early on September 17 as another trough in the westerlies arrived and the system entered it. Debby remained a tropical cyclone while crossing the North Atlantic Ocean and weakened to a tropical storm at 0600 UTC September 20. Debby was rapidly approaching the British Isles on September 20 shortly before it transitioned into an extratropical cyclone.

The remains of Debby maintained plenty of intensity over northern Europe, and on September 21 it struck northern parts of Finland (where it was named storm Mauri) as one of the most powerful windstorms in the country's recorded history. Winds over  felled millions of cubic metres of forest, and a storm surge severely damaged the cities of Kemi and Tornio, claiming two lives.

Starting in the 1982 season (with Debby), the Hurricane Hunter Aircraft (also known as P-3s) began running a new mission for NOAA's Hurricane Research Division. The mission was to drop dropwindsondes that deployed very-low Omega frequency signals. These signals were to estimate the sonde's motion compared to the aircraft in certain areas in a storm.

Preparations and impact

The United States Navy removed its 700 personnel on Bermuda's Air Force Base, placing them in a gymnasium nearby. Thousands of tourists took last-minute flights out of Bermuda on September 16 as Debby drew near. Some of the airlines had pulled back the number of flights going in and out of the island. Eastern Airlines dropped from five flights to two, with them going to only New York City, Newark, New Jersey and Boston, Massachusetts.

The storm had sustained winds of  winds, and forecasters were predicting that the hurricane's eye would be over the island the next day. Airlines canceled flights, buildings boarded up, and cruise liners were hurried out of their harbors in the time before Debby arrived. Rescue teams evacuated workers from Mobil oil rigs in Debby's path as it neared. Bermuda experienced heavy gusts of wind, which caused minor damage with no injuries or fatalities. Power outages were reported on the island, though electricity was quickly restored. Numerous trees were knocked down on the island due to high winds. As the storm was approaching Canada, some oil rigs offshore of Newfoundland were evacuated and a science expedition off Grand Banks was discontinued. In addition, a few areas experienced tropical storm forces winds, though damage was minimal.

See also

 Other storms of the same name
List of Bermuda hurricanes

References

External links
 Monthly Weather Review
 Detailed information on all storms from 1982

Debby
Debby (1982)
Debby (1982)
Debby (1982)
Debby